The 2021 Biella Challenger V was a professional tennis tournament played on outdoor red clay courts. It was part of the 2021 ATP Challenger Tour. It took place in Biella, Italy between 3 and 9 May 2021.

Singles main-draw entrants

Seeds

 Rankings are as of 26 April 2021.

Other entrants
The following players received wildcards into the singles main draw:
  Hamad Međedović
  Stefano Napolitano
  Luca Vanni

The following player received entry into the singles main draw using a protected ranking:
  Thanasi Kokkinakis

The following players received entry into the singles main draw as alternates:
  Jay Clarke
  Andrea Collarini
  Aleksandar Vukic

The following players received entry from the qualifying draw:
  Guido Andreozzi
  Viktor Galović
  Maximilian Marterer
  Felipe Meligeni Alves

The following players received entry as lucky losers:
  Marcelo Tomás Barrios Vera
  Dimitar Kuzmanov

Champions

Singles

 Juan Pablo Varillas def.  Guido Andreozzi 6–3, 6–1.

Doubles

 André Göransson /  Nathaniel Lammons def.  Rafael Matos /  Felipe Meligeni Alves 7–6(7–3), 6–3.

References

2021 ATP Challenger Tour
Tennis tournaments in Italy
2021 in Italian tennis
May 2021 sports events in Italy